Porseh Su-ye Sofla (also Romanized as Porseh Sū-ye Soflá; also known as Porseh Sū-ye Pā’īn) is a village in Gholaman Rural District, Raz and Jargalan District, Bojnord County, North Khorasan Province, Iran. It is situated in the Central Iranian Plateau and is part of the Isfahan Province. The village is well-known for its natural beauty and rich history.

According to the population census conducted in 2016, the village has a population of 1,432 people. The majority of the population are Persians who speak Farsi, the official language of Iran. The village is known for its traditional architecture and is regarded as one of the most picturesque places in the region.

The village is associated with a number of historical figures, including the famous Persian poet Hafez. It is believed that Hafez visited the village and wrote some of his famous works here. In addition, Porseh Su-ye Sofla has a number of historical structures, including the Porseh Su Bridge and the Porseh Su Waterfall, which attract visitors from all over the world.

References 

Populated places in Bojnord County